The Boeing CQM-121 Pave Tiger was an unmanned aerial vehicle developed by Boeing for use by the United States Air Force. Intended for the Suppression of Enemy Air Defenses (SEAD) role, the drone reached the flight-test stage before cancellation.

Design and development
The CQM-121 program began in 1983, with Boeing being awarded a contract for the development of a small drone aircraft that was intended for the suppression of enemy air defenses. The resulting YCQM-121A, given the code name "Pave Tiger", was a tailless aircraft powered by a two-stroke engine. The drones were to be fitted in 15-cell containers with wings folded; the sides of the container would open to allow for launch on a rail using a solid-fuel rocket booster. The aircraft would then follow a pre-programmed route, and could either use electronic countermeasures to suppress air defense systems, or use a small warhead to directly destroy them.

Operational history
Flight testing of the 13 YCQM-121A aircraft began in 1983, however the following year the project was terminated. The aircraft was resurrected in 1987, however, as an alternative to the AGM-136 Tacit Rainbow anti-radar missile; the anti-radar version, designated YCGM-121B and codenamed "Seek Spinner", first flew in 1988. It was equipped with a warhead for the destruction of enemy radars, and could loiter while awaiting detection of an enemy radar set. The program was terminated in 1989.

Also in 1987, the U.S. Air Force ordered an electronic countermeasure version of the aircraft, given the designation YCEM-138A Pave Cricket. Equipped with an AN/ALQ-176 jammer, the program was also cancelled in 1989.

Variants
YCQM-121A Pave Tiger
Original radar jamming variant; 13 built.
YCGM-121B Seek Spinner
Loitering anti-radar missile variant.
YCEM-138A Pave Cricket
Electronic countermeasures version of YCGM-121B.

Specifications (YCQM-121A)

References

CQM-121
1980s United States special-purpose aircraft
Single-engined pusher aircraft
Low-wing aircraft
Canard aircraft
Unmanned military aircraft of the United States
Aircraft first flown in 1983